Leif Gustav Adolf Liljeroth (18 October 1924 – 25 February 2018) was a Swedish film actor. He made his film debut in Hasse Ekman's Rififi in Stockholm (1961).

Filmography

Film

Television

References

External links 

 

1924 births
2018 deaths
20th-century Swedish male actors
21st-century Swedish male actors
Swedish male film actors
Swedish male stage actors
Swedish male television actors
Male actors from Stockholm